Iford may refer to

 Iford, Dorset, a suburb of Bournemouth, England
 Iford, East Sussex, a village in Lewes District, East Sussex, England
 Iford Manor, a manor house in Wiltshire, England

See also
 Ilford (disambiguation)